The Flanders Expedition of 1678 saw an English expeditionary army sent to Flanders to support the Dutch and Spanish armies against the French at the tail end of the Franco-Dutch War.

History
After the marriage of Mary, the daughter of the James, Duke of York, to William of Orange, the English sent an expeditionary force (with its own services and supply chain) to Flanders in 1678 to join the Dutch against the French in the Franco-Dutch War. The expeditionary force was commanded by the Duke of Monmouth. The English force saw little action but some British units saw action at the Battle of Saint-Denis (the last battle of the war).

At Saint-Denis, a Scottish regiment under the command of Lieutenant-Colonel Dougles attacked the French camp and the Anglo-Dutch Brigade fought in the vanguard of the Dutch Spanish army suffering many casualties.

Shortly after this battle the Treaty of Nijmegen was signed by the Dutch and France on 10 August 1678 and the campaign came to an end.

Notes

References
 

Conflicts in 1678
English Army